Allison Amend  (born May 20, 1974) is an American novelist and short story writer.

Early life
Amend was born in Chicago, Illinois,  attended Stanford University, and received an MFA from the Iowa Writers' Workshop at the University of Iowa.

Career
In 2008, OV Books, an imprint of Dzanc Books, published her debut book, a short story collection called Things That Pass for Love. She has published two novels and a third was published by Nan A. Talese in May 2016. Amend teaches writing at Lehman College in New York City.

Publications

Novels
Stations West: a novel. Louisiana State University Press (2010) 
 A Nearly Perfect Copy: a novel. Nan A. Talese (2013) 
 Enchanted Islands: a novel. Nan A. Talese (24 May 2016)

Short Story Collections
Things That Pass for Love. Dzanc Books (2008)

Awards
Sami Rohr Prize finalist

References

External links
 Amend's website

20th-century American short story writers
20th-century American women writers
21st-century American writers
21st-century American women writers
Writers from Chicago
University of Iowa alumni
Stanford University alumni
Living people
1974 births
Lehman College faculty